Jonava Airport also known as Rukla or Gaižiūnai Airfield (ICAO: EYRU) was a military airfield in Lithuania located  southeast of Jonava. It was part of Rukla–Gaižiūnai military facilities. The airport featured a linear ramp with 24 parking spaces. It is no longer used as an airfield and hosts various racing events.

Airlines and Destinations 
There are currently no scheduled passenger or cargo services to/from Jonava Airport.

References 

Lithuanian airbases
Airports built in the Soviet Union
Soviet Air Force bases
Airport
Military facilities of the Soviet Union in Lithuania
Transport in Jonava
Buildings and structures in Jonava
Sport in Jonava